This is the list of the Muslims in entertainment and the media outside Muslim-majority countries

Comedy

 Ahmed Ahmed – standup comedian, actor
 Humza Arshad – English comedian
 Dave Chappelle – standup comedian
 Said Durrah – standup comedian 
 Maz Jobrani – standup comedian, actor
Mohammed "Mo" Amer – standup comedian, actor
 Hasan Minhaj – standup comedian
 Preacher Moss – standup comedian, comedy writer
 Dean Obeidallah – standup comedian
 Aamer Rahman – Australian standup comedian
 Azhar Usman – standup comedian 
Ramy Youssef – standup comedian, actor 
 Maysoon Zayid – standup comedian, actress       
 Jamel Debbouze – French Moroccan comedian , actor

Film and television

Fady Elsayed - actor
Mammotty – molly wood actor
 Cinta Laura – Indonesian Hollywood actress
 Tania Gunadi - Indonesian Hollywood actress
 Khwaja Ahmad Abbas – director, novelist, screenwriter, journalist, Palme d'Or winner
 Nabil Abou-Harb – filmmaker, writer-director of Arab in America
 Riz Ahmed – actor, rapper, MC, activist, first Muslim actor to win Emmy for The Night Of.
 Mahershala Ali – actor, first Muslim actor to win Oscar (for Moonlight)
 Mara Brock Akil – screenwriter, producer
 Moustapha Akkad – film director, producer
 Lewis Arquette – film actor, writer, and producer
Dulquer Salmaan - actor 
 Sayed Badreya – actor, filmmaker
 Asghar Farhadi – director, screenwriter, Academy Award winner
 Aamir Khan – actor, producer, director, Academy Award nominee
 Irrfan Khan – actor
 Mehboob Khan – director, producer, actor, writer, Academy Award nominee
 Saif Ali Khan – actor, producer
 Salman Khan – actor, film producer, television personality
 Shah Rukh Khan – actor, producer, television presenter
 Abbas Kiarostami – director, screenwriter, producer, photographer, Palme d'Or winner
 Dilip Kumar (Muhammad Yusuf Khan) – actor, producer, activist
 Madhubala – actress
 Majid Majidi – director, producer, screenwriter, Academy Award nominee
 Aasif Mandvi – comedian, actor
 Rizwan Manji – actor
 Mumtaz – actress
 Mehmet Oz – medical doctor, talk show host
 Kamran Pasha – screenwriter, producer
 Serena Rasoul – comedian, actress, writer and Founder of Muslim American Casting
 Saïd Taghmaoui – actor
 Iqbal Theba – actor
 Bassem Youssef – Egyptian satirist and columnist, former host of Al-Bernameg
 Sarah Khan - Producer
 Shyama – actress in Bollywood films
 Shakila – actress in Bollywood films
 Shabana Azmi – actress in Bollywood films
 Tabu – actress in Bollywood films
 Dipika Kakar – television actress

Journalism and media
 Amina Khan – science journalist, and author of Adapt
 Ali Abbasi – former Scottish TV presenter
 Tazeen Ahmad – British television and radio presenter and reporter
 Fareena Alam – Editor of British Muslim Magazine Q News. She was named Media Professional of the Year by Islamic Relief in 2005 and at the Asian Women of Achievement Awards in 2006.
 Lisa Aziz – news presenter, and journalist. Best known as the co-presenter of the Bristol-based ITV West Country nightly weekday news programme The West Country Tonight, one of the first Asian presenters to be seen on television. She won the Ethnic Multicultural Media Academy Best Television News Journalist Award.
 Kristiane Backer – German television presenter, television journalist and author residing in London.
 Zeinab Badawi – BBC presenter of "Hard Talk"
 Anila Baig – columnist at The Sun
 Shamim Chowdhury – television and print journalist for Al Jazeera English.
 Mehdi Hasan – senior politics editor at the New Statesman and a former news and current affairs editor at Channel 4
 Nina Hossain – journalist, newscaster, and sole presenter of ITV London's regional news programme London Tonight.
 Kanak 'Konnie' Huq – television presenter, best known for being the longest-serving female Blue Peter presenter.
 Mishal Husain – currently an anchor for BBC World
 Rizwan Hussain – barrister, television presenter, philanthropist, international humanitarian worker, former Hindi music singer and producer. TV presenter for Islamic and charity shows on Channel S and Islam Channel.
 Faisal Islam – economics editor and correspondent for Channel 4 News. He was named Young Journalist of the Year at the Royal Society of Television awards 2006.
 Nurul Islam – broadcast journalist, radio producer, and presenter best remembered for his work with the BBC World Service.
 Saira Khan – runner-up on the first series of The Apprentice, and now a TV presenter on BBC's Temper Your Temper and Desi DNA
 Waheed Khan – documentary television director working in British television
 Tasmin Lucia-Khan – journalist, presenter, and producer. Best known for delivering BBC Three's nightly hourly 'World News' bulletins on in 60 Seconds, and presenting E24 on the rolling news channel BBC News. Currently delivers news bulletins and breaking stories on ITV breakfast television programme Daybreak.
 Mazher Mahmood
 Fatima Manji – British television journalist, Britain's first hijab-wearing TV newsreader
 Sarfraz Manzoor – British writer, journalist, documentary maker, and broadcaster. He writes regularly for The Guardian, presents documentaries on BBC Radio 4.
 Ajmal Masroor – television presenter, politician, Imam, and UK Parliamentary candidate for Bethnal Green and Bow constituency representing Liberal Democrats in 2010 General Election. He is a television presenter on political and Islamic programmes on Islam Channel and Channel S.
 Shereen Nanjiani – radio journalist with BBC Radio Scotland
 Adnan Nawaz – news and sports presenter working for the BBC World Service
 Amna Nawaz – Pakistani-American anchor and correspondent for PBS Newshour.
 A. N. M. Serajur Rahman – journalist, broadcaster, and Bangladeshi nationalist.
Tahera Rahman – newscaster for WHBF-TV and KLJB. Widely covered by the media for being the first American hijabi Muslim newscaster.
 Adil Ray – British radio and television presenter, for BBC Asian Network
 Fareed Zakaria – Indian American journalist and author, host of CNN's Fareed Zakaria GPS
 Abdallah Goollamallee – Mauritian journalist and entrepreneur, consultant

Literature and art
 Kia Abdullah – Novelist and journalist. She contributes to The Guardian newspaper and has written two novels: Life, Love and Assimilation and Child's Play.
 Nafeez Mosaddeq Ahmed – Author, lecturer, political scientist specialising in interdisciplinary security studies, and participant of the 9/11 Truth Movement.
 Ayad Akhtar – Writer, actor
 Kaniz Ali – Makeup artist and freelance beauty columnist. She won Best Make-Up Artist category at the 2011 International Asian Fashion Awards.
 Monica Ali – Author of Brick Lane a story based on a Bangladeshi woman.
 Tariq Ali – Historian and novelist
 Moniza Alvi – Poet and writer
 Tahmima Anam – Author of A Golden Age which was the Best First Book winner of the 2008 Commonwealth Writers' Prize.
 Nadeem Aslam – Novelist
 Reza Aslan – Iranian-American author of No god but God and Zealot, public intellectual, religious studies scholar
 Shamim Azad – Bilingual poet, storyteller and writer
 Imtiaz Dharker – Poet and documentary filmmaker
 Roopa Farooki – Novelist.
 Ruby Hammer MBE – Fashion and beauty makeup artist, and founder of Ruby & Millie cosmetics brand. 
 Mohammed Mahbub 'Ed' Husain – Writer of the book The Islamist on account of his experience for five years with the Hizb ut-Tahrir.
 Kazi Nazrul Islam – Poet, write, musician and revolutionary from Bengal. He is the national poet of Bangladesh.
 Muhammad Iqbal – One of the most important figures in Urdu literature, with literary work in both the Urdu and Persian languages.
 Razia Iqbal – Arts correspondent for the BBC; born in East Africa and is of Muslim Punjabi origin. 
 Runa Islam – Film and photography visual artist, nominated for the Turner Prize 2008.
 Hanif Kureishi – Playwright, screenwriter and filmmaker, novelist and short story writer
 Rohina Malik – Playwright, solo performance artist, story teller and speaker;
 Dr Ghulam Murshid – Author, scholar, and journalist. He's received numerous top literary awards from India and Bangladesh including the Bangla Academy award.
 Shahida Rahman – Award-winning author of Lascar, writer and publisher
 Qaisra Shahraz – Novelist, journalist, Fellow of the Royal Society of Arts and a director of Gatehouse Books 
 Rezia Wahid MBE – Award-winning textile artist whose work has been exhibited both in the UK and abroad.
 G. Willow Wilson – American comics writer, prose author, essayist, and journalist. 
 Rekha Waheed – Writer and novelist best known as the author of The A-Z Guide To Arranged Marriage.
 Saladin Ahmed – Novelist, best known for writing Throne of the Crescent Moon.
 Sabaa Tahir – Novelist, wrote Ember in the Ashes.

Modeling
Farida Khelfa – Algerian & French top model, one of the most influent model in the world. Friend of Azzedine Alaia, Christian Louboutin, Jean-paul Gaultier. 
 Katoucha Niane – French top model, who was Yves Saint Laurent's egerie. 
arjumman Mughal - indian and international Fashiom beauty and Fittness model the only model who did 2140 ads in the world till now she worked in india Singapore london china Sri Lanka Philippian.and many more.
Anissa Bakhti – French and Algerian model. Égérie of Balmain hair couture and Eddine Belmahdi
Thanina Medjber – French and Algerian top model. Egerie of Eddine Belmahdi
 Halima Aden – American fashion model, first Somali-American to compete and become a semi-finalist in the Miss Minnesota USA pageant. 
 Hanaa Ben Abdesslem – Tunisian model, first Muslim spokesmodel for the French perfume and cosmetic house Lancôme.
 Kenza Fourati – Tunisian model, first Arab Muslim model to be featured in Sports Illustrated.
 Mariah Idrissi – British Moroccan/Pakistani model, public speaker, and online personality.
 Iman (Iman Mohamed Abdulmajid) – Model and designer, Muslim originally from Somalia.
 Bella Hadid – American fashion model.
 Gigi Hadid – American fashion model.
 Esma Voloder – Model and beauty pageant titleholder who was crowned Miss World Australia 2017.
 Hammasa Kohistani – British model

Music

 Anggun – singer World Music Award winner, songwriter, and television personality.
 Ahmed Bukhatir – Emirati Nasheed Singer. He is one of the famous Islamic singers in UAE.
Ahmad Hussain – faith inspired singer/songwriter. Inducted into the Muslim Power 100 list. Founder of IQRA Promotions. 
 A. R. Rahman – composer, singer-songwriter, music producer, musician, philanthropist, Grammy Award winner, Academy Award winner
 Atif Aslam – Filmi singer
 Ahmad Jamal – jazz pianist
 Ahmet Ertegün – songwriter and founder of Atlantic Records
 Akon – singer
 Ali Shaheed Muhammad – producer, DJ and rapper. Formerly of A Tribe Called Quest. He is a Sunni Muslim.
 Art Blakey – American jazz drummer and bandleader
 Bas – rapper
 B.G. Knocc Out – rapper from Compton, California, (converted to Islam in 1999)
 Beanie Sigel – rapper
 Big Daddy Kane – rapper. He is a 5 percenter.
 Brother Ali – rapper. Converted to Sunni Islam.
 Busta Rhymes – hip-hop artist and rapper. He is a 5 percenter.
 Chali 2na – rapper. Formerly of the alternative hip-hop group Jurassic 5, and of Ozomatli
 Dawud Wharnsby – Canadian singer-songwriter, poet
 DJ Khaled – rap artist and DJ
 Everlast – rapper from the Irish-American hip-hop group House of Pain. Converted to Sunni Islam.
 Flesh N Bone – rapper
 Freeway – rapper, Sunni Muslim
 Freddie Gibbs – rapper
 French Montana – rapper
 Ghostface Killah – rapper. Member of the hip-hip group the Wu-Tang Clan
 Ice Cube – rapper, actor and producer.
 Jermaine Jackson – singer, bass guitarist
 Jay Electronica – rapper
 Junoon – Sufi rock band
 Kevin Gates – rapper
 K'naan – Canadian rapper of Somali descent He is a Sunni Muslim, and visited the Prophet's Mosque in Medina in 2015.
 Lupe Fiasco – rapper. He is a Sunni Muslim.
 MC Ren – rapper
 Mona Haydar – rapper
 Mos Def – rapper. Initially joined the Nation of Islam before converting to Sunni Islam.
 Napoleon – former member of Tupac Shakur's rap group the Outlawz, now a motivational Muslim speaker
 Native Deen – artist rap group
 Nusrat Fateh Ali Khan – Pakistani traditional singer, helped popularise Qawwali singing throughout the non-Muslim world
 Q-Tip – rapper. Formerly of A Tribe Called Quest. He is a Sunni Muslim.
 Raekwon – rapper. Member of the hip-hip group the Wu-Tang Clan
 Rakim – 5 percenter, rapper and former member of the hip-hop duo Eric B. & Rakim.
 Rhymefest – Grammy Award-winning hip hop artist and co-writer of the single "Jesus Walks"
 Scarface – rapper
Sheck Wes — Senegalese rapper and songwriter
Shila Amzah –  Malaysian singer. 
Sinéad O'Connor — Irish singer-songwriter. Converted to Islam in 2018
 Swizz Beatz – Producer
 SZA – American singer
 T-Pain – singer, rapper
 Rutaba Yaqub – Saudi Arabian singer
 Richard Thompson – British singer-songwriter
 Vinnie Paz – rapper in the hip-hop group Jedi Mind Tricks.
 Yuna – Malaysian singer-songwriter
 Yusef Lateef – jazz musician and Grammy Award winner
 Yusuf Islam – commonly known by his former stage name Cat Stevens, a British singer-songwriter, multi-instrumentalist, humanitarian, and education philanthropist.
 Zayn Malik - Pakistani-British singer-songwriter

See also
 Lists of Muslims

References

Entertainment